Clinton Municipal Airport  is seven miles southwest of Clinton, in Clinton County, Iowa. The FAA's National Plan of Integrated Airport Systems (2017-2021) categorizes it as a general aviation airport.

Clinton had scheduled airline flights from 1951-52 until 1975: Braniff until 1955, then Ozark. There was still commercial air service to Clinton into the mid-1980s. The Official Airline Guide in February 1985 showed a total of five weekday departures to O'Hare International in Chicago; Three via American Central and two via Great Lakes. Scheduled passenger service to Clinton was discontinued by the late 1980s.

Facilities

It has two asphalt runways: 3/21 is 5,204 by 100 feet (1,586 x 30 m) and 14/32 is 4,201 by 100 feet (1,280 x 30 m).

In the year ending September 10, 2015 the airport had 15,400 aircraft operations, average 42 per day: 95% general aviation, 3% military and 2% air taxi. In April 2017, 40 aircraft were based at the airport: 30 single-engine, 3 multi-engine, 1 jet and 6 ultralight.

Other uses 
The airport is the site of the annual Cessna 150 and Cessna 152 fly-in, which began in 2001. The fly-in is open to owners, pilots and enthusiasts who share a common interest in those types of airplanes.

References

External links 
 
 Clinton Municipal (CWI) at Iowa DOT Airport Directory
 
 

Airports in Iowa
Transportation buildings and structures in Clinton County, Iowa
Clinton, Iowa